Moose Range may refer to:

 the range of moose
 Rural Municipality of Moose Range No. 486, Saskatchewan, Canada
 Moose Range, Saskatchewan, Canada; a village in Rural Municipality of Moose Range No. 486
 Moose Range Lodge, Porcupine Hills Provincial Park#East Block (Woody River Block), Porcupine Hills, Saskatchewan, Canada

See also

 Kenai National Moose Range, Alaska, USA; former name of the Kenai National Wildlife Refuge